= Dungi, Islamabad =

Dungi
- Town
- Location within Pakistan
- Coordinates: 33.17°N 73.18°E
- Country: Pakistan
- Province: (Islamabad Capital Territory) Islamabad C.T
- Elevation: 441 m (1,447 ft)

Population
  - Total: 117,591
- Time zone: UTC+5 (PST)

Dungi is a town in the Islamabad Capital Territory of Pakistan. It is located at 33° 17' 25N 73° 18' 20E with an altitude of 441 metres (1447 feet). The population of the town is approximately 117,591.
